Maxwell or Max Taylor may refer to:

People
Maxwell D. Taylor (1901–1987), United States Army general and diplomat
Max Taylor (psychologist), Irish/UK psychologist
Max Taylor (musician), British singer-songwriter
Max Taylor (footballer), English professional footballer
Max Taylor, evening news anchor from 1987 to 1988 on WTWC-TV

Characters
Max Taylor, aka Screech, a vigilante protagonist in Screech
Max Taylor, minor figure in the list of Dinosaur King characters
Max Taylor, a character played by Benny Young in 1994's Funny Man (film)
Max Taylor, a character played by Edward Underdown in 1948's Brass Monkey (film)
Maxwell Taylor, a character played by Bill Maher in Out of Time (1988 film)